The Convention of the Left (CL) is an annual conference of British left, socialist, progressive and green parties and organisations, first held in Manchester in September 2008.  The format of the conference was that it 'shadowed' the Labour Party's 2008 Annual Conference, also being held in the city.  A 'recall' event was held in the city in January 2009.

Aims and values
The 'Statement of Intent' for the Convention was that it aimed to "explicitly challenge Labour's programme of warmongering, neoliberal privatisation and failure to tackle environmental destruction." The statement was signed by:

Tony Benn
Alice Mahon
Ken Loach
John McDonnell MP (Labour Representation Committee)
Robert Griffiths (General Secretary, Communist Party of Britain)
John Haylett (Editor, Morning Star)
Liz Davies
Derek Wall (former Principal Male Speaker, Green Party of England and Wales)
George Galloway (Respect politician)
Salma Yaqoob
Prof. Gregor Gall (Labour movement academic)
Chris Bambery (former editor, Socialist Worker)
Lindsey German (Counterfire)

Membership
While the CL had managed to attract the support of both Respect Renewal and the Socialist Workers' Party (at that point engaged in a protracted dispute over the demerger of the Respect – The Unity Coalition), the Communist Party of Great Britain (PCC) dismissed the event as a "talking shop" (it supporting the Campaign for a Marxist Party against "broad fronts" and for deeper discussion on differences on the Left),  however the CPGB (PCC) and its autonomous student group Communist Students signed up as supporters of the convention.  The Socialist Party did not sponsor the event as it has its own Campaign for a New Workers' Party and invited the organisers to join their campaign.

The full list of supporting party organisations is as follows:

Alliance for Green Socialism
Alliance for Workers' Liberty
A World to Win
Campaign for a New Workers' Party
Communist Students
Communist Party of Britain
Communist Party of Great Britain
European Left Party Network
Green Left
Labour Representation Committee
Left Alternative
Permanent Revolution
Respect – The Unity Coalition
Scottish Socialist Party
Socialist Alliance
Socialist Resistance
Socialist Workers' Party
Solidarity
Workers Power

It was also supported by Morning Star, Red Pepper, Labour Briefing and Socialist Worker.

References

External links
Official site
Official blog
commentisfree Guardian article

Socialism in the United Kingdom